Jordi Benet (born 15 July 1980) is an Andorran football player. He has played twice for the Andorra national team.

National team statistics

References

1980 births
Living people
Andorran footballers
Association football midfielders
Andorra international footballers